Hadji is a variant spelling of Hajji, a title and prefix that is awarded to a person who has successfully completed the Hajj (pilgrimage) to Mecca.

It may also refer to:

People

Given name
 El Hadji Ba (born 1993), French-born footballer 
 El Hadji Diouf (born 1981), Senegalese footballer
 El Hadji Guissé, Senegalese judge
 El Hadji Badiane Sidibé (born 1994) is a Senegalese professional footballer
 El Hadji Ndiaye (born 1986), Senegalese professional basketball player
 Hadji Ali (c. 1887–92–1937), vaudeville performance artist
 Hadji Ali Haseki, 18th-century Ottoman Turk despot who ruled Athens in Greece for some time
 Hadji Barry (born 1992), Guinean professional footballer
 Hadji Butu (1865–1937), Filipino politician
 Hadji Kamlon, ethnic Tausūg man who fought in World War II, and later staged an uprising against the Philippine government
 Hadji Mponda (born 1958), Tanzanian politician
 Hadji Mustafa Pasha (1733—1801), Ottoman commander and politician 
 Hadji Murad (c. 1790–1852), Caucasian leader

Surname
 Mustapha Hadji (born 1971), Moroccan international footballer
 Youssouf Hadji (born 1980), Moroccan international footballer (and Mustapha's younger brother)
 Samir Hadji (born 1989), French footballer

Other uses
 Hadji (character), a fictional character, an Indian protagonist in the American television  series Jonny Quest
 "Hadji Girl", a 2006 song by Corporal Joshua Belile of the United States Marine Corps

See also
 Hadji Murat (novella), a novella by Tolstoy whose protagonist is Hadji Murat
 Hadji Mohammad Ajul, a municipality in the Philippines
 Hadji Muhammed, an archaeological site in Southern Iraq 
 Hadji Muhtamad, a municipality in the Philippines
 Hadji Panglima Tahil, a municipality in the Philippines
 Mustafa Haji Abdinur,  Somali journalist and radio correspondent
 Stelios Haji-Ioannou (born 1967), Cypriot entrepreneur
 Hajji (disambiguation)